Gianoli is a surname. Notable people with the surname include:

 Clotilde Bressler-Gianoli (1875–1912), Swiss-Italian opera singer
 Reine Gianoli (1915–1979), French classical pianist

See also
 Xavier Giannoli (born 1972), French film director